Alamagny is a former French auto-maker.  It is remembered because of a prototype vehicle that was exhibited at various venues in France during 1947 and 1948.

Marcel Alamagny was an engineer who by 1947 had developed a curious prototype for a small four-wheeled car inspired by a “car of the future” project dreamt up in 1934 by Gabriel Voisin.   Alamagny pursued the idea further with a Pushmi-pullyu style vehicle having two visually identical front ends and no rear end.   Two of the four wheels shared the axle in the middle of the vehicle which was powered by a small four-cylinder water-cooled 569 cc engine from the Simca 5, mounted transversely.

At each end was a single wheel which steered, giving the vehicle a turning circle of just 4.25 meters (14 feet).   The driver and his passengers each sat with their backs to the engine, and therefore also to each other, giving the passengers a view through the back window.   Despite the look of the car, the gear box was conventionally configured so that driving always took place from the same end.

The vehicle was 3420 mm long and 1600 mm wide.   With four people on board a top speed of 85 km/h (53 mph) was quoted.

In 1948 the prototype was presented to the SIA (Society of Automobile Engineers), but no further development took place, and the prototype would be preserved by Amédée Gordini.

References
Jacques Rousseau und Jean-Paul Caron: Guide de l'automobile française. Solar, Paris 1988,

External links
 Images of the Alamagny prototype

Defunct motor vehicle manufacturers of France
Car manufacturers of France